USS Ward was laid down as a   (designated DD-139) in the United States Navy during World War I, later converted to a high speed transport (designated APD-16) in World War II. She was responsible for the first American-caused casualties in the Pacific in World War II when she engaged and sank a Japanese midget submarine before Japanese aircraft arrived in the attack on Pearl Harbor, killing both crewmen on board.

Design and construction
Ward was named in honor of Commander James Harmon Ward, USN, (1806–1861), the first U.S. Navy officer to be killed in action during the American Civil War. Ward was built at the Mare Island Navy Yard, California in a record of 17½ days. Under the pressure of urgent World War I needs for destroyers, her construction was pushed rapidly from keel laying on 15 May 1918 to launching on 1 June and commissioning on 24 July 1918.

Service history
Ward transferred to the Atlantic late in the year and helped support the trans-Atlantic flight of the Curtiss NC flying boats in May 1919. She came back to the Pacific a few months later, and remained there until she was decommissioned in July 1921. She had received the hull number DD-139 in July 1920. The outbreak of World War II in Europe brought Ward back into active service. She was recommissioned in January 1941. Sent to Pearl Harbor shortly thereafter, the destroyer operated on local patrol duties in Hawaiian waters over the next year.

Pearl Harbor
On the morning of 7 December 1941, under the command of LCDR William W. Outerbridge, Ward was conducting a precautionary patrol off the entrance to Pearl Harbor when she was informed at 03:57 by visual signals from the coastal minesweeper  of a periscope sighting, whereupon Ward began searching for the contact. At about 06:37, she sighted a periscope apparently tailing the cargo ship  whereupon she attacked the target. Though unconfirmed at the time, her guns holed a Japanese Ko-hyoteki-class, two-man midget submarine.  The death of its two-man crew was the first American-caused casualties in the Pacific Theatre of World War II, occurring a few hours before Japanese carrier aircraft attacked Pearl Harbor. The submarine was attempting to enter the harbor by following Antares through the antisubmarine nets at the harbor entrance. By entering territorial waters of a neutral country without signalling any intent to stop, the submarine was not entitled to "innocent passage" protections and the neutral party had a right to use whatever means to protect its territory. Ward fired several rounds from its main guns, hitting the conning tower of the submarine, and also dropped several depth charges during the attack.

Skepticism whether Ward had really sunk a Japanese mini-sub rather than some sort of false alarm incident persisted from the event for decades, until University of Hawaii scientists found the sunken remains of the Japanese vessel on 28 August 2002. The wreck was found in American waters  beneath the sea about  outside Pearl Harbor. The starboard side of the Japanese submarine's conning tower has one shell hole, evidence of damage from Wards number-three gun.

After Pearl Harbor
In 1942, Ward was sent to the West Coast for conversion to a high-speed transport. Redesignated APD-16 in February 1943, she steamed to the South Pacific to operate in the Solomon Islands area. She helped fight off a heavy Japanese air attack off Tulagi on 7 April 1943, and spent most of the rest of that year on escort and transport service. In December, she participated in the Cape Gloucester invasion. During the first nine months of 1944, Ward continued her escort and patrol work and also took part in several Southwest Pacific amphibious landings, among them the assaults on Saidor, Nissan Island, Emirau, Aitape, Biak, Cape Sansapor, and Morotai.

Fate

As the Pacific War moved closer to Japan, Ward was assigned to assist with operations to recover the Philippine Islands. On 17 October 1944, she put troops ashore on Dinagat Island during the opening phase of the Leyte invasion. After spending the rest of October and November escorting ships to and from Leyte, in early December, Ward transported Army personnel during the landings at Ormoc Bay, Leyte. On the morning of 7 December, three years to the day after she fired the opening shot of the Pearl Harbor attack, she came under attack by several Japanese kamikazes while patrolling off the invasion area. One bomber hit her hull amidships, bringing her to a dead stop.

In the movie Tora! Tora!

Awards
 World War I Victory Medal
 American Defense Service Medal with "FLEET" clasp
 Asiatic-Pacific Campaign Medal with nine battle stars
 World War II Victory Medal
 Philippine Liberation Medal with two stars

Memorial

Wards number-three  4"/50 caliber gun was removed when she was converted to a high speed transport. In 1958, the year of the Minnesota Centennial, it was installed as a memorial at the Minnesota State Capitol in St. Paul, when the men who fired it on 7 December 1941 were members of the Minnesota Naval Reserve. A plaque containing a listing of the naval reservists from Saint Paul who served aboard Ward is now displayed in the St. Paul City Hall on the third floor between the council and mayoral offices, in an area also containing the ship's bell from the cruiser . The last surviving member of the gun crew from the morning of 7 December, Alan Sanford, died in January 2015.

As of 2012, no other ship in the United States Navy has borne this name, although sometimes confusion occurs with the three destroyers named .

References

 Brown, David. Warship Losses of World War Two. Arms and Armour, London, Great Britain, 1990. .

Further reading

External links

 navsource.org: USS Ward
 UH finds sub that led Pearl Harbor attack 

1918 ships
Ships built in Vallejo, California
World War II shipwrecks in the Philippine Sea
Ward (DD-139)
Ward (DD-139)
Ward (DD-139)
Ships present during the attack on Pearl Harbor
Ward (DD-139)
Ships sunk by kamikaze attack
Destroyers sunk by aircraft
Maritime incidents in December 1944
Scuttled vessels
Shipwreck discoveries by Paul Allen
2017 archaeological discoveries